Several significant events in spaceflight occurred in 2009, including Iran conducting its first indigenous orbital launch, the first Swiss satellite being launched and New Zealand launching its first sounding rocket. The H-IIB and Naro-1 rockets conducted maiden flights, whilst the Tsyklon-3, Falcon 1 and Ariane 5GS were retired from service. The permanent crew of the International Space Station increased from three to six in May, and in the last few months of the year, Japan's first resupply mission to the outpost, HTV-1, was conducted successfully.

Overview

The internationally accepted definition of a spaceflight is any flight which crosses the Kármán line, 100 kilometres above sea level. The first spaceflight launch of the year was that of a Delta IV Heavy, carrying the USA-202 ELINT satellite, which launched from Cape Canaveral Air Force Station at 02:47 GMT on 18 January. This was also the first orbital launch of the year.

On 2 February, Iran conducted its first successful orbital launch, when a Safir was used to place the Omid satellite into low Earth orbit.

At 16:56 GMT on 10 February, the first major collision between two satellites in orbit occurred, resulting in the destruction of Kosmos 2251 and Iridium 33, launched in 1993 and 1997 respectively. Up until the collision, Iridium 33 was operational, and an active part of the Iridium network of satellites, whilst Kosmos 2251 was an inactive piece of space junk.

On 25 August, the Russo- South Korean Naro-1 rocket made its maiden flight on 25 August, marking South Korea's first involvement in conducting a satellite launch attempt, however the rocket failed to reach orbit after its payload fairing malfunctioned.

The first flight of the SpaceX Falcon 9 carrier rocket was scheduled to occur in November, but was delayed to February 2010 to allow more time for preparations. The SpaceX Dragon, a commercial uncrewed logistics spacecraft which was developed as part of NASA's COTS programme, was also scheduled to make its first flight in 2009, however its launch has also slipped to 2010 as a result of knock-on delays. The first H-II Transfer Vehicle, HTV-1, was successfully launched on the maiden flight of the H-IIB carrier rocket on 10 September. The first Swiss satellite, SwissCube-1, was launched on 23 September aboard a PSLV.

On 18 December, the Ariane 5GS made its final flight, delivering the Helios-IIB satellite into a sun-synchronous orbit. The last orbital launch of the year was conducted eleven days later, on 29 December, when a Proton-M with a Briz-M upper stage launched the DirecTV-12 satellite.

Space exploration

Although no planetary probes were launched in 2009, four astronomical observatories were placed into orbit. The Kepler spacecraft, which was launched by a Delta II on 7 March, entered an Earth-trailing heliocentric orbit from where it will search for exoplanets. On 14 May, and Ariane 5ECA launched the Herschel and Planck spacecraft. Both were placed at the L2 Lagrangian point between the Earth and Sun, from where they will be used for astronomy. Herschel carries an infrared telescope whilst Planck carries an optical one. The fourth observatory to be launched was the Wide-field Infrared Survey Explorer, or WISE, which is a replacement for the Wide Field Infrared Explorer which failed shortly after launch. WISE was launched into a sun-synchronous orbit by a Delta II on 14 December, and will be used for infrared astronomy. Repairs made to the Hubble Space Telescope during STS-125 restored it to full operations after a series of malfunctions in 2008.

Two lunar probes were launched in 2009; the Lunar Reconnaissance Orbiter and Lunar Crater Observation and Sensing Satellite were launched on a single Atlas V rocket on 18 June. LRO entered selenocentric orbit and began a series of experiments, whilst LCROSS remained attached to the Centaur upper stage of the carrier rocket, and flew past the Moon. After orbiting the Earth twice, LCROSS separated from the upper stage and both it and the Centaur impacted the Cabeus crater at the South Pole of the Moon, on 9 October. By observing the Centaur's impact, LCROSS was able to confirm the presence of water on the Moon. Several other Lunar probes ceased operations in 2009; Okina impacted the far side of the Moon on 12 February, Chang'e 1 was deorbited on 1 March, having completed its operations. Kaguya was also deorbited following a successful mission, impacting near Gill crater on 12 June. The Chandrayaan-1 spacecraft failed on 29 August, having operated for less than half of its design life.

The Mars Science Laboratory and Fobos-Grunt missions to Mars had been scheduled for launch at the end of 2009, however both were delayed to 2011 to allow more time for the spacecraft to be developed. Fobos-Grunt, a sample return mission to Mars' natural satellite Phobos, would have carried the first Chinese planetary probe, Yinghuo-1.

Several flybys occurred in 2009, with Cassini continuing to orbit Saturn, passing close to a number of its natural satellites. In February, Dawn passed within  of Mars, during a gravity assist manoeuvre for its journey to the asteroid belt. In September, MESSENGER made its third and final flyby of Mercury before entering orbit in 2011. Whilst the primary objective of the flyby, achieving a gravitational assist, was successful, the spacecraft entered safe mode shortly before its closest approach, which prevented it recording data as it flew away from the planet. In November, the Rosetta spacecraft performed its third and final gravity assist flyby of Earth.

Crewed spaceflight

Nine crewed launches occurred in 2009, the most since 1997. STS-119, using , was launched on 15 March. It installed the last set of solar arrays on the International Space Station. Soyuz TMA-14, the 100th crewed Soyuz launch, delivered the Expedition 19 crew in March. In May,  conducted the final mission to service the Hubble Space Telescope, STS-125. Several days later, Soyuz TMA-15 launched with the ISS Expedition 20 crew, brought the total ISS crew size up to six for the first time. This was also the 100th crewed spaceflight of the Soyuz programme, excluding the original Soyuz T-10 mission which failed to reach space. In July,  delivered the final component of the Japanese Experiment Module on mission STS-127. STS-128, using Discovery in August, delivered supplies using the Leonardo MPLM. September saw the launch of Soyuz TMA-16, with the ISS Expedition 21 crew. This was the 100th crewed Soyuz mission reach orbit. In November, Space Shuttle Atlantis flew mission STS-129, delivering two EXPRESS Logistics Carriers to the ISS. The final crewed flight of the year, Soyuz TMA-17, was launched on 20 December with the ISS Expedition 22 crew.

Although not a spaceflight in its own right, the Ares I-X test flight was conducted on 28 October, with the rocket lifting off from Launch Complex 39B of the Kennedy Space Center at 15:30 GMT. A parachute failure during descent resulted in some damage to the first stage, which was recovered.

Launch failures

Four orbital launch failures occurred in 2009. On 24 February, a Taurus-XL launched from the Vandenberg Air Force Base in California, United States, with the Orbiting Carbon Observatory. The payload fairing did not separate from the rocket, leaving the upper stage with too much mass to reach orbit. The stage, with spacecraft and fairing still attached, reentered the atmosphere, coming down off the coast of Antarctica. The second failure was a controversial North Korean launch attempt using an Unha rocket to launch the Kwangmyŏngsŏng-2 communications satellite. The launch was conducted on 5 April, and North Korea maintains that it successfully reached orbit, however no objects from the launch were tracked as having orbital velocity, and US radar systems tracking the rocket detected that it failed at around the time of third stage ignition, with debris falling in the Pacific Ocean.

A Soyuz-2.1a suffered a failure during the launch of Meridian 2 on 21 May, due to the premature cutoff of the second core stage of the carrier rocket. The satellite was placed in a lower than planned orbit, which it was initially expected to be able to correct by means of its onboard propulsion system, and the launch was reported to be a partial failure. By the time of the next Meridian launch in 2010 it had been confirmed that the satellite could not correct its own orbit, and that the mission was a failure. On 25 August, the Naro-1 rocket was launched on its maiden flight, however one half of the payload fairing failed to separate, and it did not reach orbit.

On 31 August a Long March 3B placed the Palapa-D satellite into a lower than expected orbit after its third stage gas generator burned through, resulting in an engine failure at the start of the second burn. The satellite was able to raise itself to its correct orbit at the expense of fuel which would have been used for five or six years of operations.

Summary of launches
In total, seventy eight orbital launches were attempted in 2009, with seventy five catalogued as having reached orbit, and the three outright launch failures, including the North Korean launch, not being catalogued. This is an increase of nine attempts compared to 2008, and eight more launches reached orbit. This continues a four-year trend of increasing annual launch rates. The United States National Space Science Data Center catalogued 123 spacecraft placed into orbit by launches which occurred in 2009.

Suborbital spaceflight in 2009 saw a number of sounding rocket and missile launches. New Zealand's Ātea-1 sounding rocket was launched on 30 November, marking that country's first suborbital flight. Russia twice attempted launches of its Bulava missile, however both launches failed. The second failure, which occurred on 9 December, resulted in a spiral pattern which was observed in the sky over Norway. The SpaceLoft-XL rocket experienced another launch failure during its third flight, on 2 May. The payload section separated from the rocket whilst it was still burning, and as a result the vehicle did not reach space. It had been carrying samples of cremated human remains for Celestis, and student experiments.

By country
China conducted six launches in 2009; satellite problems early in the year followed by the fallout of the August partial launch failure resulted in many planned launches slipping into 2010. Europe launched seven Ariane 5 rockets, six in the ECA configuration and one in the GS configuration. It had also intended to launch the first Vega rocket, however this was delayed due to ongoing development issues, which had already left the project several years behind schedule. India conducted two launches of Polar Satellite Launch Vehicles, however the first flight of a new variant of the Geosynchronous Satellite Launch Vehicle with an Indian-built upper stage slipped into 2010. Japan conducted three launches; two using the H-IIA, plus the first H-IIB. Russia and the former Soviet Union conducted twenty nine launches, not including the international Sea and Land launch programmes, which conducted four, and the single Naro-1 launch conducted in cooperation with South Korea.

The United States made twenty four launch attempts, with the Evolved Expendable Launch Vehicles accounting for eight; the most EELV launches in a single year to date. Eight Delta II launches were also made, including its last mission with a GPS satellite, and its last flight with a payload for the United States armed forces. As the Delta II programme wound down, Space Launch Complex 17A at the Cape Canaveral Air Force Station, one of the oldest operational launch pads in the world, was deactivated. SpaceX launched a single Falcon 1, which successfully placed an operational satellite into orbit for the first time. This was the final flight of the Falcon 1, which was subsequently retired from service in favour of the Falcon 1e. At the start of the year, a mockup Falcon 9 was erected on its launch pad at Canaveral, however the type's maiden flight slipped into 2010.

Sea Launch only conducted a single launch in 2009; a Zenit-3SL launched Sicral 1B in April. In June, the company was declared bankrupt, and subsequently it lost a number of launch contracts. By the end of the year it was expecting to resume launches in 2010. Its subsidiary, Land Launch, conducted three launches. Iran made its first successful indigenous orbital launch, however planned follow-up launches had not been conducted by the end of the year. North Korea made one launch which it claimed had successfully placed a satellite into orbit, however no such satellite was detected by any country capable of doing so. Israel was not reported to have scheduled or conducted an orbital launch attempt.

Orbital launches

|colspan=8 style="background:white;"|

January
|-

|colspan=8 style="background:white;"|

February
|-

|colspan=8 style="background:white;"|

March
|-

|colspan=8 style="background:white;"|

April
|-

|colspan=8 style="background:white;"|

May
|-

|colspan=8 style="background:white;"|

June
|-

|colspan=8 style="background:white;"|

July
|-

|colspan=8 style="background:white;"|

August
|-

|colspan=8 style="background:white;"|

September
|-

|colspan=8 style="background:white;"|

October
|-

|colspan=8 style="background:white;"|

November
|-

|colspan=8 style="background:white;"|

December
|-

|}

Suborbital flights

|}

Deep space rendezvous

Distant, non-targeted flybys of Dione, Mimas, Rhea, Tethys and Titan by Cassini occurred throughout the year.

EVAs

Orbital launch statistics

By country

By rocket

By family

By type

By configuration

By launch site

By orbit

See also
List of human spaceflights
Suborbital spaceflight in 2009
Timeline of spaceflight

References

Footnotes

 
Spaceflight by year